Michael Barford (born 7 June 1950) is an English cricketer. He played fifteen first-class matches for Cambridge University Cricket Club between 1970 and 1971.  He scored 109 on his first-class debut for the University in the second innings against MCC at Fenner's on 5 July 1969. The match was subsequently downgraded. His next first-class opportunity was against Leicestershire, at Fenner's on 6 June 1970.

Mike also won blues for Hockey and was Treasurer of the Quidnuncs Cricket Club for many years.

See also
 List of Cambridge University Cricket Club players

References

External links
 

1950 births
Living people
English cricketers
Cambridge University cricketers
Sportspeople from Eastbourne